José Miguel Nieves Pinto (born June 16, 1975, in Guacara, Carabobo State, Venezuela) is a Venezuelan former professional baseball shortstop. He played for the Chicago Cubs (1998–2000) and Anaheim Angels (2001–02) of  Major League Baseball (MLB). He batted and threw right-handed.

Career
In a five-season career, Nieves was a .242 hitter with nine home runs and 51 RBI in 212 games.

He became manager of the Dayton Dragons in 2013.

See also
 List of players from Venezuela in Major League Baseball

References

External links
 or Retrosheet

1975 births
Living people
Anaheim Angels players
Baseball players at the 2007 Pan American Games
Caribes de Oriente players
Chicago Cubs players
Columbus Clippers players
Daytona Cubs players
Guerreros de Oaxaca players
Iowa Cubs players
Major League Baseball players from Venezuela
Major League Baseball shortstops
Memphis Redbirds players
Minor league baseball managers
Navegantes del Magallanes players
People from Carabobo
Portland Beavers players
Rieleros de Aguascalientes players
Rockford Cubbies players
Rojos del Águila de Veracruz players
Salt Lake Stingers players
Venezuelan expatriate baseball players in Mexico
Venezuelan expatriate baseball players in the United States
West Tennessee Diamond Jaxx players
Williamsport Cubs players
Pan American Games competitors for Venezuela